Mary Anna Henry (1834–1903) was a prolific diarist who documented her experiences and observations while residing in Washington, DC's Smithsonian Institution Building during the American Civil War. Her diary, which was transcribed by the Smithsonian Institution, is noted for its level of detail and is used to teach the history of the Civil War.

Early life 
Mary Anna Henry was born in Princeton, New Jersey to Joseph and Harriet Henry. The Henry family relocated to Washington, DC when Mary's father, Joseph Henry, was appointed as the first Secretary of the Smithsonian Institution. The Henry family lived in the Smithsonian's Castle building from 1855 to 1878.

Diary 
From 1858 to 1868, Henry kept a diary that included her experiences within the Smithsonian building, news reports of major  
Civil War battles, observations of troop movements, and attitudes of the people of Washington, DC.  Henry also wrote a 

detailed retelling of the Assassination of Abraham Lincoln and his funeral.

In her life in Washington, DC, Henry met with powerful social, political, and military leaders.  Due to her father's position, Henry also greeted and entertained scholars and scientists visiting the Smithsonian Institution Building, or "the Castle".

References

External links 
Mary Henry's Diary

1834 births
1903 deaths
People from Princeton, New Jersey
American diarists
19th-century American women writers
19th-century American biographers
19th-century diarists